Kök-Jar is a village in Kochkor District, Naryn Region of Kyrgyzstan, just to the south-west of Kochkor. Its population was 2,880 in 2021.

References

Populated places in Naryn Region